Courtlandt Sherrington "Cort" Gross (21 November 1904 – 15 July 1982) was an American aviation pioneer and executive who served as a leading officer of Lockheed Corporation for 35 years. He retired as chairman in 1967.

Life and career
Gross was born in Boston, Massachusetts, and attended Harvard University. He and his brother Robert E. Gross purchased the company Lockheed Corporation in 1932 and built it into an aerospace conglomerate.

Gross, his wife Alexandra Van Rensselaer Devereux Gross, and their housekeeper Catherine O'Hara VanderVeur were murdered in their home in Villanova, Pennsylvania. Drifter Roger P. Buehl was convicted of the murders.

Courtlandt and Alexandra Gross were interred at St. Thomas' Church Cemetery in Whitemarsh, Pennsylvania.

References

External links
Time magazine cover illustration of Gross February 11, 1966.

1904 births
1982 deaths
Burials in Pennsylvania
Businesspeople in aviation
Businesspeople from Boston
Harvard University alumni
People murdered in Pennsylvania
20th-century American businesspeople